Joseph Donald Barnett (born January 10, 1944) is an American retired college basketball coach. He was a former head basketball coach at several Division I institutions, the most high-profile being Virginia Commonwealth University, where his most notable win consisted of a buzzer-beater NCAA Tournament win over Jim Calhoun's Northeastern Huskies.  He is also well known for being a mentor of Tubby Smith.  Most notably, Barnett taught Smith the philosophy of ball-line defense, which is a strategy that requires all defenders to stay between the line of the ball and the baseline.  He was most recently the head coach and athletic director at Division II Hawaii Pacific.

Barnett graduated from Winona State University in 1966 with two varsity letters each in baseball and basketball.  He was inducted into the school's athletic hall of fame in 2002.

Coaching career 
Barnett has a career record of 317–229 (.580) in Division I basketball, including 7 NCAA tournament appearances. During his stay at Virginia Commonwealth, Barnett led the Rams to 5 NCAA tournament appearances, with 4 of those resulting in 1st round victories. In his first two years at Tulsa, he led the Golden Hurricane to back-to-back NCAA tournament appearances. Both of those, however, resulted in 1st round exits. That was the last time J.D. Barnett made the NCAAs.

Also, Maurice Cheeks, former head coach of the Philadelphia 76ers, was recruited by and played under Barnett while he was an assistant coach at West Texas State. While at West Texas State, Barnett is credited with organizing "The Cager Club", a support group that helped the basketball program.

In addition, Tom Izzo was hired by Barnett to be his recruiting coordinator at Tulsa. Izzo left a low-paying student assistant position with Jud Heathcote to take the position with Tulsa. That experiment lasted all of seven weeks before Heathcote called Izzo offering him an assistant coaching position back in East Lansing.

Administrative career
From 1991 to 1994, Barnett was athletic director at Union High School in Tulsa, Oklahoma. Barnett also served as associate athletic director at Northwestern State while head men's basketball coach from 1994 to 1999. From 2000 to 2004, Barnett was senior associate athletic director for revenue development at Tulane University in New Orleans.

Head coaching record

References

External links
 Hawaii Pacific profile (2004)

1944 births
Living people
American men's basketball players
Basketball coaches from Missouri
Basketball players from Missouri
College men's basketball head coaches in the United States
Hawaii Pacific Sharks athletic directors
Hawaii Pacific Sharks men's basketball coaches
High Point Panthers men's basketball coaches
Lenoir–Rhyne Bears men's basketball coaches
Louisiana Tech Bulldogs basketball coaches
Northwestern State Demons basketball coaches
People from Linn County, Missouri
Tulsa Golden Hurricane men's basketball coaches
VCU Rams men's basketball coaches
West Texas A&M Buffaloes basketball coaches
Winona State Warriors baseball players
Winona State Warriors men's basketball players